Ellis Smith (4 November 1896 – 7 November 1969) was a British Labour Party politician.  He was elected at the 1935 general election as Member of Parliament (MP) for Stoke and served as Parliamentary Secretary to the Board of Trade from 1945 to 1946. He was elected the first MP for the new Stoke-on-Trent South constituency when the seat was created in 1950, and served until his retirement in 1966.  His successor was Jack Ashley.

References

External links 
 

1896 births
1969 deaths
Labour Party (UK) MPs for English constituencies
Members of the Fabian Society
Ministers in the Attlee governments, 1945–1951
Parliamentary Secretaries to the Board of Trade
UK MPs 1935–1945
UK MPs 1945–1950
UK MPs 1950–1951
UK MPs 1951–1955
UK MPs 1955–1959
UK MPs 1959–1964
UK MPs 1964–1966
United Patternmakers' Association-sponsored MPs